Jared Falk (born 1981 in Abbotsford, British Columbia, Canada) is a Canadian professional drummer, teacher and businessman. He is the founder and CEO of Drumeo.

Biography
Falk started playing drums at age 15 and teaching his first student at age 16.  He has played with artists such as Riley Armstrong and Cory Alstad.

In 2012, he founded Drumeo, an online drumming tutorial site offering video lessons with a number of instructors. Drumeo has also hosted guest lessons from well-known drummers including Benny Greb, Anika Nilles, Bernard Purdie, Thomas Lang, Dennis Chambers, Mark Guiliana, Taylor Gordon, Jonathan Moffett, Tommy Igoe, Peter Erskine, Gene Hoglan, Eric Boudreault, Russ Miller, Stanley Randolph, Senri Kawaguchi, David Garibaldi, and Antonio Sanchez, . Drumeo was first runner-up for the Drum Magazine Drummie award for Education Site in 2013 before winning in 2014 and 2015. Jared Falk endorses Paiste cymbals and Evans Drumheads.

References

External links 
 Drumeo
 FreeDrumLessons.com
 DrumLessons.com

1981 births
Living people
Canadian male drummers
People from Abbotsford, British Columbia
21st-century Canadian drummers
21st-century Canadian male musicians